Roll film or rollfilm is any type of spool-wound photographic film protected from white light exposure by a paper backing. The term originated in contrast to sheet film. Confusingly, roll film was originally often referred to as "cartridge" film because of its resemblance to a shotgun cartridge.

The opaque backing paper allows roll film to be loaded in daylight. It is typically printed with frame number markings which can be viewed through a small red window at the rear of the camera. A spool of roll film is usually loaded on one side of the camera and pulled across to an identical take up spool on the other side of the shutter as exposures are made. When the roll is fully exposed, the take up spool is removed for processing and the empty spool on which the film was originally wound is moved to the other side, becoming the take up spool for the next roll of film.

History

In 1881 a farmer in Cambria, Wisconsin, Peter Houston, invented the first roll film camera. His younger brother David, filed the patents for various components of Peter's camera.   
David Henderson Houston (born June 14, 1841; died May 6, 1906), originally from Cambria, Wisconsin,  patented the first holders for flexible roll film. Houston moved to Hunter in Dakota Territory in 1880. He was issued an 1881 patent for a roll film holder which he licensed to George Eastman (it was used in Eastman's Kodak 1888 box camera). Houston sold the patent (and an 1886 revision) outright to Eastman for $5000 in 1889. Houston continued developing the camera, creating 21 patents for cameras or camera parts between 1881 and 1902. In 1912 his estate transferred the remainder of his patents to Eastman.

 The most popular roll film format is 120 film, which is used in most medium format cameras and roll film magazines for large-format cameras. Until the 1950s, 120 roll film was, with the smaller 127 film, also used in the simplest of box cameras and other snapshot cameras. The use of roll film in consumer cameras was largely superseded by 135 and 126 cartridges, but 120 and 220 (double length) film are still commonly used in medium format cameras.

Automatic film speed sensing
In 1998, Fujifilm introduced a film identification system for 120 and 220 format roll film called Barcode System (with logo "|||B"). The barcode encoding the film format and length as well as the film speed and type is located on the sticker between the emulsion carrying film and the backing paper. This 13-bit barcode is optically scanned by newer medium format cameras like the Fujifilm GA645i Professional, GA645Wi Professional, GA645Zi Professional, GX645AF Professional, GX680III Professional, GX680IIIS Professional, Hasselblad H1, H2, H2F and H3D Model I with HM 16-32 as well as by the Contax 645 AF.

See also
 Film stock
 Brownie (camera)
 Film format
 List of color film systems
 List of film formats

References

Film formats
Photography equipment